The Warrens Bridge is a historic timber-trestle bridge carrying Phillips County Road 141 across the Lambrook Levee Ditch west of Lambrook, Arkansas. It was built about 1930.

The bridge was listed on the National Register of Historic Places in 1995.

See also
National Register of Historic Places listings in Phillips County, Arkansas
List of bridges on the National Register of Historic Places in Arkansas

References

Road bridges on the National Register of Historic Places in Arkansas
Bridges completed in 1930
National Register of Historic Places in Phillips County, Arkansas
Trestle bridges in the United States
Wooden bridges in the United States
1930 establishments in Arkansas